The Gibbs House is a historic house in Gainesville, Sumter County, Alabama.  The one-story wood-frame structure was built for Hawkins Gibbs from 1860 to 1861.  The vernacular Greek Revival style house features a main central block with a side-gable roof, flanked by front-gabled wings to either side.  The front facade of the main block features a full-width porch, set under the main roof.  A similar version of this arrangement, largely unique to the Gainesville area in Alabama, is seen at Aduston Hall and a number of other nearby houses.  It was added to the National Register of Historic Places on October 3, 1985.

References

National Register of Historic Places in Sumter County, Alabama
Houses on the National Register of Historic Places in Alabama
Greek Revival houses in Alabama
Houses completed in 1861
Houses in Sumter County, Alabama
1861 establishments in Alabama